Demmitt is a hamlet in northern Alberta, Canada within the County of Grande Prairie No. 1. The Northern Alberta Railway was built through the area in 1930 as it extended westwards towards Dawson Creek, British Columbia.

Demographics 

Demmitt recorded a population of 18 in the 1966 Census of Population conducted by Statistics Canada.

See also 
List of communities in Alberta
List of hamlets in Alberta

References 

County of Grande Prairie No. 1
Hamlets in Alberta